Faustina Charles Mfinanga (born November 9, 1992), popularly known by her stage name Nandy is a Tanzanian actress, singer and songwriter of Pare heritage, she was born and raised in the city of Moshi in Kilimanjaro Region. She won the All Africa Music Awards twice in the best female artist in East Africa category in 2017 and 2020.

Early life
Nandy was born in Moshi, Tanzania to Mary Charles, a tailor and Charles Mfinanga, a mechanic. The name Nandy is shortened from her real name Nandera. She started performing at a very tender age. At 5 years of age, she was an active member of her Sunday school choir at KKKT Lutheran church in Moshi. She attended Mawenzi Primary School and later joined Lomwe High School where she became the head of School choir. After high school, she joined College of Business Education (CBE), Dar es Salaam, Tanzania.

Career

Music
Her career in music kicked off when a common friend introduced her to Ruge Mutahaba, CEO of Tanzania House of Talent (THT). This is where she met Emma the Boy, who produced her first mainstream single, Nagusagusa.The song became a huge hit within a week of its release. 

In early 2016 she participated in a singing competition Tecno own the stage. The contest featured contestants from all over Africa and during the finals in Lagos, Nigeria, Nandy emerged as the first runner-up. The competition groomed her well music wise, as she gained performance confidence, and also acquired essential knowledge of the music industry from the musical tutors and mentors such as chocolate City's M.I Abaga, Yemi Alade and Bien of Sauti Sol.

In 2017 she released her hit single One Day which spearheaded her career and gave her a couple of opportunities as she was one of the few artists who participated in Coke Studio Africa in 2017 and later the same year she was nominated in the All Africa Music Awards as best female eastern Africa and won.

In January 2023, Nandy launched her own record label named "The African Princess"  and signed Yammi, who is the label's first signee

Acting 
Nandy played herself in Huba, a series aired on Maisha Magic Bongo.

Goodwill Ambassador

She is currently Tanzania's Goodwill ambassador for UNICEF's water, sanitation and hygiene programme (WASH) that works in over 100 countries worldwide to improve water and sanitation services, as well as basic hygiene practices. The programme focuses on providing people with clean water and basic toilets.

Controversies
In April 2018, Nandy and fellow Tanzanian singer, Bill nass were briefly detained by the Tanzanian authorities for sharing what they considered as being indecent or obscene content online.

Discography

Albums
 The African Princess (2018)
 Wanibariki EP        (2021) 
Taste Of  Love EP (2021)
Maturity EP (2022)

Singles 
 I'm Confident (2013)
 Nagusa gusa (2017)
 One Day (2017)
 Wasikudanganye (2017)
 Kivuruge (2017)
 Ninogeshe (2018)
Aibu (2018)  
Hazipo(2019)
Halleluya(2019)
Kiza Kinene(2019)
Kata (2020)
Na Nusu
Acha Lizame ft Harmonize
Dozi
Do me ft Bill Nass
Nibakishie ft (alikiba)
number one ft joeboy
Leo Leo ft koffi olomide
nimekuzoea
Yuda
kunjani ft show madjozi
kufuli ft mariootz

Awards and nominations

References

External links

 
 
 

21st-century Tanzanian women singers
People from Dar es Salaam
1987 births
Living people
Swahili-language singers
Tanzanian musicians
 Tanzanian Bongo Flava musicians